Eating Out is a gay-themed American film.

Eating Out may also refer to: 

Eating Out (film series), five LGBT-themed sex comedy films that began with Eating Out
"Eating out", a slang term for performing cunnilingus
"Eating outside (of the home)," as in a restaurant
Eating Out (TV series)